Air Brousse was a Congolese airline. The carrier was formed in 1955 by a group of Belgians and flew services within the Belgian Congo, mainly from Leopoldville and Luluabourg. Air Brousse also operated feeder services for Sabena. It had its headquarters in Leopoldville.

History
The Belgians who owned the company were distributors for Aero Commander, Hughes and Piper aircraft in the Congo. In the beginnings, the carrier flew local scheduled services from Leopoldville and Luluabourg, but charter services were also undertaken. It also run feeder services for Sabena.

By , the fleet comprised four Rapides, two Piper Pacer, two Tri-Pacers and one Tiger Moth that worked scheduled and charter services within the Belgian Congo. The carrier also run a maintenance facility for private aircraft. Focusing mainly on the transport of passengers, at this time the airline also undertook aerial works and kept a minor shareholding in Air Congo, which had been formed in 1961 with the government and Sabena being the major shareholders, together keeping 95% of the shares, and Air Brousse and Sobelair holding the balance.

Air Brousse operated until 31 December 1966. Cogeair took over some of the routes formerly operated by Air Brousse.

See also

Transport in the Democratic Republic of the Congo

Citations

Bibliography

Airlines established in 1955
Defunct airlines of the Democratic Republic of the Congo
Airlines disestablished in 1967
1955 establishments in the Belgian Congo